is a line of collectible anthropomorphic animal figurines made of flocked plastic. They were created by the Japanese gaming company Epoch in 1985 and distributed worldwide by a number of companies.

History

Beginning and growth
At the beginning of production, on March 20, 1985, Sylvanian Families were created and released in Japan by Epoch, which uses the concept of dollhouses and anthropomorphic animal figures. The first releases of the dollhouses and other playsets were made of porcelain and the furniture was made of wood. However, later releases replaced the materials with plastic and metal in the production. The toys were later released in North America the same year, but with different packaging and minor differences to the characters themselves. The toyline was originally titled , but was changed to its current name. "Sylvanian" means "of the forest", from the Roman god Silvanus.

In October 1987, the series spawned an animated series produced by DIC Animation City and TMS Entertainment, which ran for 13 episodes. The series was popular in the UK and Spain. The name of the television series based on Sylvanian Families was adapted in different countries. It was also shown in the US in the late 1980s on The CBN Family Channel and in the late 1990s on PAX TV. Later that same year, the success in these markets led to expansion into Western Europe, beginning with the UK subsidiary of Tomy acquiring exclusive rights for the brand in the UK. Tomy introduced Sylvanian Families into the UK market in 1987, and it quickly became a bestseller.

By 1988, Sylvanian Families had become a major success around the world, winning the British Association of Toy Retailers award for "Toy of the Year" three years consecutively, in 1987, 1988 and 1989. 

In 1993, Tomy, who had been distributing the toys worldwide, lost the rights to the name "Sylvanian Families" in Canada and the US. Tomy reintroduced the line under the new name Calico Critters of Cloverleaf Corners, now simply just called Calico Critters. The Calico Critters line is currently distributed in the US and Canada by Epoch Everlasting Play, LLC.

Decline and reinvention

By the late 1990s, Sylvanian Families had been discontinued in the UK, although since 1999, they have been reintroduced by Flair. An independent Sylvanian Families shop opened in 1992 in Finsbury Park, London. Subsequently, Sylvanian families have been reintroduced in Australia and are becoming more widely available there. Tomy stopped selling Calico Critters, but a new company, International Playthings, now called Epoch Everlasting Play, picked up the line.

In 1999, the toyline celebrated its 15th anniversary in Japan, with the opening of the themed restaurant , which was operated and managed by Epoch. The restaurant not only served food, but also sold merchandise and toys based on the franchise. The restaurant closed in February 2011.

In 2004, the franchise celebrated its 20th anniversary in Japan with the release of the Walnut Squirrel Family. That July, Epoch announced a new attraction in Grinpa, a theme park managed by Fuji Kyuko. In 2005, the franchise hosted its very first live event titled  which was hosted at the Gekidan Kogumaza Theatre. It was later released on DVD in 2006.

In 2006, the characters in the toy line were chosen to be the mascots for the National Federation of Workers and Consumers Insurance Cooperativess national mutual aid. By the end of the year, the toys sold a total of 78 million units.

In 2007, Epoch teamed up with Itochu, Nippon Columbia and Shogakukan to produce a 3D CGI Original Video Animation series based on the toy line produced by Kōji Kawaguchi and Yumiko Muriai and directed by Akira Takamura. All 3 episodes were released on June 20, 2007. According to Epoch, more episodes were planned, but these were never produced for unknown reasons. In the UK, Flair celebrated the franchise's 20th anniversary with a selected number of new items. The best selling was an Otter boat, and a reintroduced Dalmatian Family who now wore party hats that read "Happy 20th!".

In March 2009, the series celebrated its 25th anniversary in Japan with the opening of the Sylvanian Gardens attraction in Grinpa. Managed by Epoch, the attraction features real-life replicas of the houses and buildings from the toy line as well as a museum featuring an exhibition about the history of the toys. The attraction also has a shop which sells items exclusive to the park.

In 2013, the rights for the toys in the UK were transferred to the newly formed Epoch UK, and they began distributing the toys from January 1, 2014 onwards. Flair stopped distributing the toys on December 31 the same year. 

In 2015, a series of tableaux by the British artist Mimsy featuring Sylvanian Families being threatened by "MICE-IS" terrorists was banned from the Passion for Freedom exhibition.

In 2020 to celebrate the 35th anniversary customers were asked to participate in a poll to choose their favourite character with the winner being reintroduced. The sheep family came third, beaver family second and the duck family were announced as the winners.

The Sylvanian Families shop in London announced its closure in March 2023.

Setting
The majority of the families are all rural middle-class, with many of them owning localized but successful family businesses, or having jobs, such as doctor, teacher, artist, news reporter, carpenter or bus driver. They are designed wearing 1950s-like fashion. They can live in large, multistory houses, or own dwellings based on the premise of a kind of holiday home. The houses are designed very realistically and can be decorated and redesigned. They can also participate in leisure activities such as sailing or horse-riding, and often host garden parties or go on short camping holidays.

The characters, grouped into families, originally depicted typical woodland creatures such as rabbits, squirrels, bears, beavers, hedgehogs, foxes, deer, owls, raccoons, otters, skunks and mice, and later expanded to other animals such as cats, dogs, hamsters, guinea pigs, penguins, monkeys, cows, sheep, pigs, elephants, pandas, kangaroos, koalas and meerkats. Most families consist of a father, mother, sister and brother, and continue to add family members from there on such as grandparents, babies, and older siblings.

Media

Animation
There are several animated series based on the Sylvanian Families world: Sylvanian Families, a syndicated series that premiered in 1987; Stories of the Sylvanian Families (1988), a British series animated in stop motion; and a 2007 original video animation series also called Sylvanian Families. A new OVA was then produced in 2015 with another in 2017, promoting the Sylvanian Families Town sub-line. Both OVAs were produced by Shogakukan Music and Digital Entertainment and were also released outside Japan through YouTube and Netflix.

In 2017, a 12-episode animated television short series titled Sylvanian Families Mini Stories was also produced by Shogakukan Music and Digital Entertainment and aired on TV Tokyo in Japan from October 7 to December 23. A second season aired on Tokyo MX and TV Kanagawa in Japan from October 3 to December 19, 2018. A third season aired on October 3, 2019. Netflix holds the streaming rights to the first season of the series while Amazon has the streaming rights to the second season.

Games
Aside from the animated series, the series also spawned seven video games, all produced by Epoch.
  (Game Boy Color)
  (Game Boy Color)
  (Game Boy Color)
  (Game Boy Color)
  (Game Boy Advance)
  (Game Boy Advance)
  (Game Boy Advance)
  (Windows 98)
  (Sega Pico)

In popular culture
 In the Hulu comedy series PEN15, which depicts the experiences of American middle school students in the early 2000s, the lead characters Maya and Anna play regularly with Sylvanian toys.
 In the series Miss Sherlock (S1E4), the boy Daiki plays with a Sylvanian toy.
 Ruth Galloway's daughter is gifted a Sylvanian windmill for her fifth birthday in The Ghost Fields by Elly Griffiths.
 In the book The Suitcase Kid by Jacqueline Wilson, main character Andy has a Sylvanian rabbit called Radish who provides her with comfort.
 In the series Robot Chicken (S11E4), four college friends attend the Sylvanian Family Summer Festival which turns out to be a dark cult. This is a parody of the movie Midsommar.
 In an episode of the British sitcom series Miranda (S3E2), Stevie, who is the best friend and manager of the joke / gift shop owned by the titular character (played by Miranda Hart), says that if she won the lottery, she would buy a complete set of Sylvanian Families. In another episode (S4E2, also the final episode of the whole series), Stevie orders a range of animal onesies for the shop, and tries on a white rabbit onesie, and Miranda comments that she looks like one of the Sylvanian Families.

References

Source

External links
 Official Epoch UK website
 Official Japanese website 
 Calico Critters Official US Website
 Unofficial Sylvanian Families spanish website 
 Official Flair UK (and ROI) Collectors Club and shop (now defunct)

1980s toys
1990s toys
Products introduced in 1985
Epoch Co. games
Toy figurines
Toy animals